Marnach is a small town in the commune of Munshausen, in northern Luxembourg.  As of 2007, the town has a population of 581.  Near Marnach is the site of the transmitter of Radio Luxembourg.

The parish church of St Josef and St Martin was built in 1888 to the plans of the architect Jean-Pierre Knepper, in the neo-Gothic style.

References

Munshausen
Towns in Luxembourg